The muscular process of arytenoid cartilage is the posterolateral projection of the (short, rounded, and prominent) lateral angle of the base of the arytenoid cartilage. The muscular process gives insertion to the posterior cricoarytenoid muscles behind, and to the lateral cricoarytenoid muscles in front.

References 

Human head and neck